Goldstar shoes (Nepali:गोल्ड स्टार जुत्ता) is a brand of shoe produced in Nepal.  The shoe is popularly tied with the Maoist insurgency in Nepal that continued for a decade. During the civil war, anyone seen wearing a pair of Goldstar shoes was enough to wind up in prison accused of being part of the rebel force due to its easy availability and cheapness.  During the war, the army opted to starve the rebels by imposing a blockade that deprived Maoist strongholds of both food and footwear- the Goldstar shoes. 

The Goldstar brand was initiated by Noor Pratap Rana in mid 1970s as a family business.  It is manufactured by Kiran Shoe Manufacturers  which produce about 25000 shoes per day.   The brand has been marketed in India, Australia and Malaysia, among other countries.  Due to the popularity of the shoes, many fake shoes are also produced locally with the same name.  The shoes have various showrooms in all major city and towns of Nepal.

References

Shoe brandsdeska
Nepalese culture